The following is a list of the major publications of Johann Wolfgang von Goethe (1749–1832). 142 volumes comprise the entirety of his literary output, ranging from the poetical to the philosophical, including 50 volumes of correspondence.

Scientific texts
1790: Versuch die Metamorphose der Pflanzen zu erklären (The Metamorphosis of Plants),
1810: Zur Farbenlehre (Theory of Colours),

Autobiographical
1811–1830: Aus meinem Leben: Dichtung und Wahrheit (From my Life: Poetry and Truth) autobiographical work in 4 volumes
1817: Italienische Reise (Italian Journey), journals
1836 and 1848: Gespräche mit Goethe (Conversations with Goethe) also translated as: Conversations with Eckermann - posthumous

Non-fiction
1793: Die Belagerung von Mainz, (The Siege of Mainz), non-fiction
July 1798-1801: Propyläen, periodical
1805: "Winckelmann und sein Jahrhundert" ("Winckelmann and His Century")

Prose
1774: Die Leiden des jungen Werthers (The Sorrows of Young Werther), novel
1794: Reineke Fuchs, fable
1794–95: Unterhaltungen deutscher Ausgewanderten, novella, which also includes the fairy tale Das Märchen
1795: Das Märchen (The Green Snake and the Beautiful Lily), fairy-tale
1796: Wilhelm Meisters Lehrjahre (Wilhelm Meister's Apprenticeship), novel
1809: Die Wahlverwandtschaften (Elective Affinities), novel
1821: Wilhelm Meisters Wanderjahre, oder Die Entsagenden (Wilhelm Meister's Journeyman Years, or the Renunciants/Wilhelm Meister's Travels), novel
1828: Novella, novella

Poetry
1769   "Ohne Hast, ohne Rast"  ("Haste not, Rest not")
1771: "Heidenröslein" ("Heath Rosebud"),
1773: "Prometheus",
1774: "Der König in Thule",
1782: "Der Erlkönig" ("The Alder King"),
1790: Römische Elegien (Roman Elegies), collection
1795  "Ich Denke Dein" ("I Think of You")
1795–96 (in collaboration with Friedrich Schiller): Die Xenien (The Xenia), collection of epigrams
1797: "Der Zauberlehrling" (The Sorcerer's Apprentice), (which was later the basis of a symphonic poem by Paul Dukas, which in turn was animated by Disney in Fantasia)
1797: "Die Braut von Korinth" ("The Bride of Corinth"),
1798: Hermann und Dorothea (Hermann and Dorothea), epic
1798: Die Weissagungen des Bakis (The Soothsayings of Bakis)
1799: " The First Walpurgis Night",
1813: "Gefunden" ("Found"),
1819: Westöstlicher Diwan, variously translated as The West-Eastern Divan, The Parliament of East and West, or otherwise; collection of poems in imitation of Sufi and other Sunni Muslim poetry, including that of Hafez.
1823: "Marienbad Elegy",

Drama
1773: Götz von Berlichingen, drama
1775: , tragedy in five acts
1787: Iphigenie auf Tauris (Iphigenia in Tauris), drama
1788: Egmont, drama
1790: Torquato Tasso, drama
1803: Die Natürliche Tochter (The Natural Daughter), play originally intended as the first part of a trilogy on the French revolution
1808: Faust, Part One, closet drama
1832: Faust, Part Two, closet drama

References

 Bibliography
Goethe
Goethe
Poetry bibliographies